1981National Professional Road Race Championship
William Nickson (born 30 January 1953) is a British former cyclist. He won the 1976 Milk Race whilst riding for the Great Britain "A" team. He competed in the individual road race and team time trial events at the 1976 Summer Olympics. He also rode in the 1977 Tour de France.

References

External links
 

1953 births
Living people
British male cyclists
Olympic cyclists of Great Britain
Cyclists at the 1976 Summer Olympics
Sportspeople from Liverpool